Nedžad Mulabegović (born 4 February 1981) is a  Croatian shot putter of Bosniak origin. His personal best throw is 20.67 metres, achieved in July 2014 in Varaždin, Croatia.

He finished twelfth at the 2000 World Junior Championships and won the bronze medal at the 2003 Summer Universiade. He also competed at the 2004 Olympic Games, the 2006 European Championships, the 2007 World Championships, the 2008 Olympic Games, 2009 World Championship in Berlin and the 2012 Olympic Games, without reaching the finals. He attended Purdue University.

Competition record

References

External links
 
 Purdue profile

1981 births
Living people
Naturalized citizens of Croatia
Croatian male shot putters
Athletes (track and field) at the 2004 Summer Olympics
Athletes (track and field) at the 2008 Summer Olympics
Athletes (track and field) at the 2012 Summer Olympics
Olympic athletes of Croatia
People from Derventa
Purdue Boilermakers men's track and field athletes
Mediterranean Games bronze medalists for Croatia
Athletes (track and field) at the 2009 Mediterranean Games
Universiade medalists in athletics (track and field)
Mediterranean Games medalists in athletics
Universiade bronze medalists for Croatia
World Athletics Championships athletes for Croatia
Medalists at the 2003 Summer Universiade
Bosniaks of Croatia
21st-century Croatian people